Multiservice tactical brevity codes are codes used by various military forces.  The codes' procedure words, a type of voice procedure, are designed to convey complex information with a few words.

American/NATO codes
This is a list of American standardized brevity code words. The scope is limited to those brevity codes used in multiservice operations and does not include words unique to single service operations. While these codes are not authoritative in nature, all services agree to their meanings. Using the codes eases coordination and improves understanding during multiservice operations. The codes are intended for use by air and ground operations personnel at the tactical level. Code words that are followed by an asterisk (*) may differ in meaning from NATO usage.

A
Aborting/Abort/Aborted Directive/informative call to cease action/attack/event/mission.
Action Directive to initiate a briefed attack sequence or maneuver.
Active An emitter is radiating.
Add (system/category) Directive call to add a specific system or electronic order of battle (EOB) category to search responsibility.
Alarm Directive/informative call indicating the termination of emission control (EMCON) procedures.
Alligator Link-11/tactical digital information link (TADIL) A.
Alpha check Request for/confirmation of bearing and range to described point.
Anchor/anchored
Orbit about a specific point; refueling track flown by tanker
Informative call to indicate a turning engagement about a specific location.
Angels Height of a friendly aircraft (altitude) in thousands of feet (e.g., "Angels Five" is 5,000 ft).
Anyface Airborne Early Warning (AEW) aircraft.
Arizona No anti-radiation missile (ARM) ordnance remaining.
As fragged Unit or element will be performing exactly as stated by the air tasking order (ATO).
Ashcan ASW depth charge.
Authenticate To request or provide a response for a coded challenge.
Autocat Any communications relay using automatic retransmissions.
Away Friendly weapon release (e.g. "Missile away" or "Pig Away")
Azimuth Two or more groups primarily separated in bearing.

B
Ball  Aircraft carrier optical landing system.
Bandit An aircraft identified as enemy, in accordance with theater ID criteria. The term does not necessarily imply direction or authority to engage.
Banzai Information/directive to execute launch and decide tactics.
Base (number) Reference number used to indicate such information as headings, altitude, and fuels.
Bassett Rocket-thrown ASW torpedo.
Bead Window Last transmission potentially disclosed unauthorized information.
Beam/beaming Target stabilized within 70 to 110 degree aspect; generally (direction) given with cardinal directions: east, west, north, or south.
Bent System indicated is inoperative.
Bingo
 Minimum fuel state needed for aircraft to return to base.
 Proceed/am proceeding to specified base (field) or carrier.
Bird Friendly surface-to-air missile (SAM).
Bird(s) affirm Surface-to-air (S/A) informative call indicating unit is able and prepared to engage a specified target with SAMs (presumes target is within or will enter the SAM engagement envelope).
Bird(s) away Friendly SAM has been fired at designated target.
Bird(s) negat S/A informative call indicating unit is unable to engage a specified target with SAMs. Opposite of bird(s) affirm.
Bittersweet  Notification of possible blue on blue (friendly fire) situation relative to a designated track or friendly aircraft.
Blank A suppression of enemy air defenses (SEAD) aircraft does not detect any emitters of interest.
Blind No visual contact with friendly aircraft/ground position; opposite of "Visual".
Bloodhound ASW Torpedo.
Bloomer Disregard my last transmission.
Blow through Directive/informative call that indicates aircraft will continue straight ahead at the merge and not turn with target/targets.
Blue on blue Friendly fire, inadvertent hostile engagement between allies.
Bogey  A radar or visual air contact whose identity is unknown.
Bogey dope  Request for target information as briefed/available.
Box  Groups/contacts/formations in a square or offset square. FM 101-5-1 MCRP 5-2A
BRAA  Tactical control format providing target bearing, range, altitude, and aspect, relative to a friendly aircraft or bullseye.
Bracket Indicates geometry where friendly aircraft will maneuver to a position on opposing sides, either laterally or vertically from the target.
Break (direction) Directive to perform an immediate maximum performance turn in the direction indicated; assumes a defensive situation.
Breakaway Tanker or receiver directive call indicating immediate vertical and nose/tail separation between tanker and receiver is required.
Brevity Radio frequency is becoming saturated, degraded, or jammed and briefer transmissions must follow.
Broadcast Request/directive to switch to broadcast control.
Broke lock Loss of radar/infrared (IR) lock-on (advisory).
Bruiser Friendly air-launched anti-ship missile (AShM) (for example, Harpoon, Exocet, or Penguin missiles).
Buddy lock Locked to a known friendly aircraft; normally a response to a spike or buddy spike call and accompanied with position/heading/altitude.
Buddy spike Friendly aircraft air-to-air indication on radar warning receiver (RWR); to be followed by position, heading, and altitude.
Bugout Separation from that particular engagement/attack/operation; no intent to (direction) re-engage/return.
Bulldog Friendly surface/submarine-launched AShM (for example, Harpoon, Exocet, Otomat).
Bullseye An established point from which the position of an object can be referenced; made by cardinal/range or digital format.
Bump/Bump-up Start temporary increase of flight altitude to set the aircraft to a favorable glide path to the target on the attack run.
Burn glint Used to provide illumination.
Buster Directive call to fly at maximum continuous speed.
Buzzer Electronic communications jamming.

C
Candygram Informative call to aircraft that electronic warfare (EW) targeting information is available on a briefed secure net.
Cap/capping
Directive call to establish an orbit at a specified location. (location)
An orbit at a specified location.
Captured Aircrew has identified and is able to track a specified air-to-ground (A/G) target with an onboard sensor.
Cease In air defense, break the engagement on the target specified. Missiles in flight engagement will continue to intercept.
Cease fire Discontinue firing and/or Do not open fire; complete intercept if weapons are in flight; continue to track.
CERTSUB Visual sighting of a submarine.
Champagne An attack of three distinct groups with two in front and one behind.
Chattermark Begin using briefed radio procedures to counter communications jamming.
Cheapshot
(USAF) Active missile supported to high pulse repetition frequency (HPRF, better against oncoming targets), but not medium pulse repetition frequency (MPRF, better against targets flying away).
(Naval) Active missile not supported to active range.
Check turn degrees left or right and maintain new heading. (Left/right)
Cherubs Height of a friendly aircraft in hundreds of feet.
Chicks Friendly aircraft.
 Christmas tree to turn on all exterior lighting.
Clean
No radar contacts on aircraft of interest.
No visible battle damage
Aircraft not carrying external stores.
Cleared Requested action is authorized (no engaged/support roles are assumed).
Cleared hot Ordnance release is authorized.
Cloak Directive/informative call to switch from normal external lighting to covert night vision device (NVD) only compatible lighting.
Closing Decreasing in range.
Cobra ASW torpedo in gyro angle snake search (GASS) mode (eg Mk46).
Cold
Attack geometry will result in a pass or rollout behind the target.
On a leg of the combat air patrol (CAP) pointed away from anticipated threats.
Group( s) heading away from friendly aircraft.
In ASW, designated unit has lost sonar contact.
Color Request for information on a (system) at stated location; usually a request for (system/position) ambiguity resolution. May be used with improved data modem (IDM) data message−color, data.
Comeoff Directive to maneuver as indicated to either regain mutual support or to (left/right/deconflict flight paths for an exchange of engaged and supporting roles; low/dry) implies both visual and tally.
Commit/committed Fighter intent to engage/intercept; controller continues to provide information.
Confetti Chaff lane or corridor.
Cons/conning Threat/bogey aircraft leaving contrails.
Contact
Sensor contact at the stated position.
Acknowledges sighting of a specified reference point.
Continue Continue present maneuver; does not imply clearance to engage or expend ordnance.
Continue dry Ordnance release not authorized.
Cover/covering Directive/informative call to take Surface/Air action or establish an air-to-air (A/A) posture that will allow engagement of a specified target or threat.
Cowboys Ships of an ASW Search and Attack Unit (SAU).
Crank To maneuver beyond the range of a missile; implies illuminating target at radar gimbal limits in a beyond visual range engagement.
Cutoff Request for, or directive to, intercept using cutoff geometry.
Cyclops  Any unmanned aerial vehicle (UAV).

D
Dakota No air to ground (ATG) ordnance remaining.
Dash (#) Aircraft position within a flight. Use if specific call sign is unknown.
Data  Standby for improved data modem (IDM) data message concerning (object) at stated location.
Datum Last known position of a submarine contact after contact was lost.
Deadeye Informative call by an airborne laser designator indicating the laser/IR system is inoperative.
Deadstick No propulsive power due to loss of the engine/s. - see Deadstick landing
Declare Inquiry as to the identification of a specified track(s), target(s), or correlated group.
Defensive/defending Aircraft is in a defensive position and maneuvering with reference to an active threat.
De-louse Directive to detect and identify unknown aircraft trailing friendly aircraft.
Deploy Directive to maneuver to briefed positioning.
Divert Proceed to alternate mission or base.
Dogbox Area within which units may interfere with or be endangered by ASW torpedoes
Dolly Tactical Digital Information Link C [Link-4A] (Link-4A/TADIL C).
Drag/dragging
(USAF) Target stabilized at 0 to 60 degrees aspect. (direction)
(Naval) Target stabilized at 120 to 180 degrees aspect.
Drop/dropping
Directive/informative call to stop monitoring a specified emitter/target and resume search responsibilities.
Remove the emitter/target from tactical picture/track stores.
Duck Tactical air-launched decoy (TALD).
Dustbin Nuclear ASW depth charge.

E
Echelon Groups/contacts/formation with wingman displaced approximately 45 degrees behind leader's 3/9 (o'clock) line, see Echelon formation.
Echo Positive SEESAW/electronic warfare weapons system (EWWS)/System M/Mode X reply.
Engaged Maneuvering with the intent to kill; this implies visual/radar acquisition of target.
Estimate Provides estimate of the size, range, height, or other parameter of a specified contact; implies degradation.
Extend Short-term maneuver to gain energy, distance, or separation; normally with the (direction) intent of re-engaging.
Eyeball 
 Fighter with primary visual identification responsibility.
 Electro-optical (EO)/IR/NVD acquisition of an aircraft. Normally followed by  number of aircraft observed.

F
Faded Radar contact is lost. (Termination of track plotting is not warranted.)
Fast Target speed is estimated to be at least  ground speed or Mach 1.
Father Tactical air navigation (TACAN) station.
Feather visual sighting of a periscope wake.
Feeler Fire control radar.
Feet wet/dry Flying over water/land.
FENCE (in/out) Set cockpit switches as appropriate prior to entering/exiting the combat area (mnemonic for fire-control system/ECM/navigation/communication/Emitters).
Fish
Inbound torpedo.
Flank/flanking
 (USAF) Target with a stable aspect of 120 to 150 degrees.
 (Naval) Target with stable aspect of 30 to 60 degrees.
Flash (system) Temporarily turn on pre-briefed identification, friend or foe (IFF) mode or system.
Float Directive/informative call to expand the formation laterally within visual limits to maintain a radar contact or prepare for a defensive response.
 Fox (number)  Simulated/actual launch of air-to-air weapons.
ONE - semiactive radar-guided missile, such as an AIM-7 Sparrow or Skyflash.
TWO - infrared-guided missile, such as an AIM-9 Sidewinder or AIM-132 ASRAAM.
THREE - active radar-guided missile, such as an AIM-120 AMRAAM or AIM-54 Phoenix.
FOUR - (outdated) air-to-air or air-to-surface gunfire. Replaced by Guns.
Fox mike  Very high frequency (VHF)/frequency modulated (FM) radio.
Friendly A positively identified friendly contact.
Furball A turning fight involving multiple aircraft with known bandits and friendlies mixed.
Flat  Even yourself out or calibrate yourself

G
Gadget Radar or emitter equipment.
Gate Directive/informative call to fly as quickly as possible, using afterburner/maximum power.
Gimbal Radar target is approaching azimuth or elevation limits. (Direction)
Gingerbread Directive to establish/maintain tighter brevity over voice communications.
Glowworm Flare-dropping aircraft
Go active Go to the briefed HAVE QUICK net (UHF radio frequency hopping mode)
Goblin Enemy diesel electric powered submarine.
Go clear Use unencrypted voice communications.
Goggle/degoggle Directive/informative call to put on/take off night vision devices.
Gorilla Large force of indeterminate numbers and formation.
Go secure Use encrypted voice communications.
Grandslam All hostile aircraft of a designated track (or against which a mission was tasked) are shot down.
Green (direction) Direction determined to be clearest of enemy air-to-air activity.
Greyhound Friendly ground attack cruise missile (for example, Tomahawk land attack missile (TLAM) and conventional air-launched cruise missile (CALCM)).
Group Radar targets within approximately 3 nautical miles (~3.5 miles, ~5.6 kilometers) of each other.
Guns An air-to-air or air-to-surface gunshot.

H
Hard (direction) High-G, energy-sustaining turn.
Head/head on
 (USAF) Target with an aspect of 160 to 180 degrees.
 (Naval) Target with an aspect of 0 to 20 degrees.
Heads up Alert of an activity of interest.
Heavy A group or package known to contain three or more entities.
Hit(s)
 Air-to-air (A/A) Momentary radar returns search. (Indicates approximate altitude information from fighter.)
 Air-to-ground (A/G) Weapons impact within lethal distance.
Hold down Directive to key transmitter for direction-finding (DF) steer.
Holding hands Aircraft in visual formation.
Hold fire An emergency fire control order used to stop firing on a designated target, to include destruction of any missiles in flight.
Home plate Home airfield or carrier.
Hook (left/right) Directive to perform an in-place 180-degree turn.
Hostile A contact identified as enemy upon which clearance to fire is authorized in accordance with theater rules of engagement.
Hot
 Attack geometry will result in rollout in front of the target.
 On a leg of the CAP pointing toward the anticipated threats.
 Group heading towards friendly aircraft; opposite of COLD.
 Ordnance employment intended or completed.
 Anti-Aircraft weapon is operational and tracking.
 In ASW, designated unit has a sonar contact.
Hotdog Informative/directive call that an aircraft is approaching or at a specified standoff distance from the sovereign airspace of a nation (as defined by national boundaries or territorial sea and airspace). (Color may indicate additional standoff distance.) Follow briefed procedures.
Hotshot Informative call that an aircraft is deploying flares for either system testing or visual acquisition purposes
Hotel fox High frequency (HF) radio.
Husky (Naval) Air intercept missile (AIM)-120 supported to HPRF active range; same meaning as USAF cheapshot.

I
ID (pronounced eye dee)
 Directive to identify the target.
 Identification accomplished, followed by type.
In (direction) Informative call indicating a turn to a hot aspect relative to a threat/target.
India Mode IV.
 Indians Ships of an ASUW Surface Attack Group (SAG).
Interrogate Interrogate the designated contact of the IFF mode indicated.

J
Jackal Surveillance network participating group (NPG) of tactical data information link J Link 16 (link 16/TADIL J).
Joker Fuel state above BINGO at which separation/bugout/event termination should begin.
Judy Aircrew has radar/visual contact on the correct target, has taken control of the intercept, and only requires situation awareness information. Controller will minimize radio transmissions.

K
Kill
 Clearance to fire.
 In training, a fighter call to indicate kill criteria have been fulfilled.
Knock it off Directive to cease air combat maneuvers/attacks/activities.

L
Ladder Three or more groups/contacts in range.
Laser on Directive to start laser designation.
Lead-trail Tactical formation of two contacts within a group separated in range or following one another.
Leaker(s) Airborne threat has passed through a defensive layer. Call should include amplifying information.
Line abreast Two contacts within a group side by side.
Lights on/off Directive to turn on/off exterior lights.
Locked Final radar lock-on; sort is not assumed. (BRAA/direction)
Lost contact Radar contact lost. (drop track is recommended.)
Lost lock Loss of radar/IR lock-on (advisory).

M
MaddogLaunch of friendly active radar homing air-to-air missile, such as the AIM-120, without radar guidance from the launch aircraft. The missile will rely on its own radar to find a target and will generally track the first target it sees.
Magnum Launch of friendly anti-radiation missile (such as AGM-88 HARM, ALARM).
Mapping Multifunction radar in an Air/Ground mode.
Marking Friendly aircraft leaving contrails.
Marmon 5" (127 mm) gun.
Marshal/Marshalling Establish/established at a specific point.
Merge/merged
 Information that friendlies and targets have arrived in the same visual arena.
 Call indicating radar returns have come together.
Mickey HAVE QUICK radio time-of-day (TOD) signal
Midnight Informative call advising that command and control (C2) functions are no longer available; opposite of "Sunrise".
Monitor Maintain radar awareness on or assume responsibility for specified group.
Mother Parent ship.
Mud Radar warning receiver (RWR) indication of ground threat.  Add clock position/azimuth and radar type, if known.
Music Electronic radar jamming and deception.

N
Nails Radar warning receiver (RWR) indication of an AI radar in search mode. Add clock position/azimuth and radar type, if known.
Naked No radar warning receiver (RWR) indications.
New picture Used by controller or aircrew when tactical picture has changed. Supersedes all previous calls and re-establishes picture for all players.
No factor Not a threat.
No joy Aircrew does not have visual contact with the target, bandit or landmark; opposite of Tally.
Notch All-aspect missile defensive maneuver to place threat radar/missile on the beam (directly perpendicular). Modern pulse-doppler radars remove ground clutter by filtering out returns from stationary objects; putting the threat on the beam permits the defending aircraft to be confused with ground returns and hence disappear from the threat radar. As missiles guide by creating a direct intercept course, this is also used to reduce the missile's speed and thus its ability to maneuver if radar lock is maintained.

O
Off (direction) Informative call indicating attack is terminated and maneuvering to the indicated direction.
Offset Informative call indicating maneuver in a specified direction with reference to (direction) the target.
On station Informative call unit/aircraft has reached assigned station.
Opening Increasing in range.
Oranges Weather.
Out (direction) Informative call indicating a turn to a cold aspect relative to the threat; opposite of in.
Outlaw Informative call that a bogey has met point of origin criteria.

P
Package Geographically isolated collection of groups/contacts/formations.
Padlocked Informative call indicating aircrew cannot take eyes off an aircraft or a surface position without risk of losing tally/visual.
Paint(s) Interrogated group/radar contact that is responding with any of the specified IFF modes and correct codes established for the id criteria.
Panther Enemy nuclear powered attack submarine.
Parrot IFF transponder.
Paveway Release of laser-guided bomb or bombs
Picture Provide tactical situation status pertinent to mission.
Pig Friendly glide weapon (e.g. AGM-154 JSOW). Wordplay on JSOW.
Pigeons Magnetic bearing and range to homeplate (or specified destination). (Location)
Pince/pincer Threat maneuvering for a bracket attack.
Pitbull Informative call that an active radar-guided missile (such as AIM-120, AIM-54, Meteor) is at active range and no longer requires radar input from launch aircraft.
Playmate Cooperating aircraft.
Playtime Amount of time aircraft can remain on station.
(freq) Pogo (freq) Switch to communication channel number preceding POGO. If unable to establish communications, switch to channel number following POGO. If no channel number follows POGO, return to this channel.
Pop Starting climb for air-to-surface attack.
Popeye Flying in clouds or area of reduced visibility.
Popup 1. Informative call of a contact that has suddenly appeared inside of meld/CCR/briefed range. 2. Criteria used as a self-defense method, within the ROE, to protect friendly air defense elements from hostile aircraft.
Posit Request for position; response in terms of a geographic landmark, or off a common reference point.
Post attack Directive transmission to indicate desired direction after completion of (Direction) intercept/engagement.
Post hole Rapid descending spiral.
Press Directive to continue the attack; mutual support will be maintained. Supportive role will be assumed.
Print (type) Unambiguous Non-Cooperative Target Recognition (NCTR) reply.
Privateer Enemy patrol boat.
PROBSUB Contact with strong cumulative evidence of being a submarine.
Pull chocks Depart. Get ready to depart. (Refers to pulling concrete blocks from aircraft wheels to allow take-off)
Pump A briefed maneuver to low aspect (where aspect refers to target position—regardless of distance—relative to the friendly aircraft's nose; "high aspect" would be on an azimuth in front of the friendly, while "low aspect" would indicate position along an azimuth behind the friendly) to stop closure on the threat or geographical boundary, with the intent to re-engage.
Pure Informative call indicating pure pursuit is being used or directive to go pure pursuit.
Push (channel) Go to designated frequency. No acknowledgment required.
Pushing Departing designated point.
Pushing Informative call that said group( s) have turned cold and will continue to be (group description) monitored.

R
Range Two or more groups separated primarily in distance along the same bearing.
Raygun Indicates a radar lock-on to unknown aircraft; a request for a buddy spike (position/heading/altitude) reply from friendly aircraft meeting these parameters (to prevent friendly fire).
Reference Directive to assume stated heading. (Direction)
Repeat Used in surface-surface operations to fire again using the same method of fire (during adjustment) or to fire the same number of rounds using the same method of fire (during fire for effect). This is not used to request that the last message be retransmitted (for this, use say again).
Reported Identification of an object or a contact by an intelligence system. (Type)
Request tasking requesting an objective (or heading) from ground control or from AWACS towards an area of operation.
Reset Proceed to a pre-briefed position or area of operation.
Resume Resume last formation/station/mission ordered.
Retrograde Directive to withdraw from present position or area of operation in response to a threat.
Rider A bogey that is conforming with safe passage routing/airspeed/altitude procedures.
Rifle Friendly air-to-ground missile launch.
Ringer ASW Mortar.
Ripple Two or more munitions released or fired in close succession.
Riser Suddenly appearing radar contact.
River City Implement immediate communications blackout until further notice.
Roger Radio transmission received; does not indicate compliance or reaction.
Rolex (±time) Time-line adjustment in minutes from planned mission execution time. (Positive is later).
Roman Candle Nuclear tipped surface to air missile.
Rope Illumination of an aircraft with an IR pointer.

S
Saddled Informative call from wingman/element indicating the return to briefed formation position.
SAM (direction) Visual acquisition of a SAM (surface-air missile) or SAM launch; should include position.
Sandwiched A situation where an aircraft/element is positioned between opposing aircraft/elements.
Saunter Fly at best endurance.
Scram Emergency directive to egress for defensive or survival reasons. (Direction)
Scramble Takeoff as quickly as possible.
Scud Any threat tactical/theater ballistic missile (TBM).
Separate Leave a specific engagement; may or may not re-enter.
Shackle One weave, a single crossing of flight paths; maneuver to adjust/regain formation parameters.
Shadow Follow indicated target.
Shift Directive to shift laser illumination.
Shooter Aircraft/unit designated to employ ordnance.
Shotgun Pre-briefed weapons state at which separation/bugout should begin.
Skate Informative call/directive to execute launch and leave tactics.
Skip it Veto of fighter commit, usually followed with further directions.
Skosh Aircraft is out of or unable to employ active radar missiles.
Skunk A radar or visual maritime surface contact whose identity is unknown.
Slapshot Directive for an aircraft to employ a range-unknown high-speed anti-radiation (type/bearing) missile (HARM) against a specified threat at the specified bearing.
Slide Directive call to high value airborne asset (HVAA) to continue present mission while extending range from target in response to perceived threat.
Smash Directive to turn on/off anti-collision lights.
Smoke Smoke marker used to mark a position.
Snake Directive to oscillate an IR pointer about a target.
Snap (direction)  An immediate vector to the group described.
Sniper Directive for an aircraft to employ a range-known HARM against a specified threat at the specified location.
Snooze Directive/informative call indicating initiation of EMCON procedures.
Sort/sorted 
 Directive to assign targeting or monitoring responsibility for multiple targets within a group; criteria can be met visually, electronically (radar), or both.
 Sort responsibility has been met.
Sour
 Equipment indicated is operating inefficiently.
 Invalid response to an administrative IFF check. (Opposite of sweet.)
Spades An integrated group/radar contact which lacks the ATO (or equivalent) IFF modes and codes required for the ID criteria.
Sparkle Target marking by IR pointer; target marking by gunship or forward air controller (airborne) (FAC-A) using incendiary rounds.
Spike Radar warning receiver (RWR) indication of an AI radar in track, launch, or unknown mode.  Add clock position/azimuth and radar type, if known.
Spin Directive/informative call to execute a pre-briefed timing/spacing maneuver.
Spitter An aircraft that has departed from the engagement or is departing the engaged (direction) fighters' targeting responsibility.
Splash A/A Target destroyed, or A/S weapons impact.
Split An informative call that a flight member is leaving formation to engage a threat; visual may not be maintained.
Spoofing Informative call that voice deception is being employed.
Spot Acquisition of laser designation.
Squawk (number/code) Operate IFF as indicated or IFF is operating as indicated.
Squawk flash Use the flash feature on the IFF which cause the transponder signal to highlight on radar display.  Hence the term means to announce your location.
Squawking An informative call denoting a bogey is responding with an IFF mode (#).
Stack Two or more groups/contacts/formations with a high/low altitude separation in relation to each other.
Status Request for tactical situation.
Steady Directive to stop oscillation (wavering) of IR pointer.
Steer Set magnetic compass heading indicated.
Stern Request for, or directive to, intercept using stern geometry.
Stinger Within a group, a formation of three or more aircraft with a single aircraft in trail.
Stop Stop IR illumination of a target.
Stranger Unidentified traffic that is not associated with the action in progress.
Strangle Turn off equipment indicated.
Strip Individual fighter/section is leaving the formation to pursue separate attacks.
Stripped Informative call from wingman/element indicating out of briefed formation/position.
Strobe Radar indications of noise jamming.
Sunshine Directive or informative call indicating illumination of target is being conducted with artificial illumination.
Sunrise Informative call that C2 functions (Command & Control) are available. (opposite of midnight).
Sweet
 Equipment indicated is operating efficiently.
 Valid response to an administrative IFF check. (Opposite of sour.)
Switch/switched Indicates an attacker is changing from one aircraft to another.

T
Tactical Request/directive to switch to tactical control.
Tag (system Known identification of a specific (system) at the stated location; may be used w/position) with IDM data message, (for example, tag data).
Tally Sighting of a target, bandit, bogey, or enemy position; opposite of no joy.
Target Directive to assign group responsibility to aircraft in a flight.
Targeted Group responsibility has been met.
Ten seconds Directive to terminal controller to stand by for laser on call in approximately 10 seconds.
Terminate
 Stop laser illumination of a target.
 Cease local engagement without affecting the overall exercise.
Threat Untargeted hostile/bandit/bogey within pre-briefed range/aspect of a (direction) friendly.
Throttles Reduction in power to decrease IR signature.
Tied Positive radar contact with element/aircraft.
Tiger Enough fuel and ordnance to accept a commit.
Timber Air control network participating group (NPG) of tactical digital information links (Link 16/TADIL J).
Track Any detected point of contact visible on a radar or sonar display console, each identified by a unique number.
Tracking
 Fire control system has solid lock on target (aka a "stabilized gun solution").
 Continuous illumination of a target.
 Contact heading.
Trailer The last aircraft within a group(s).
Trashed Informative call that missile has been defeated.
Trespass The addressed flight is entering a surface/air threat ring of a specific system at the stated (position) location.
Tucker 76mm gun.
Tumbleweed Indicates limited situational awareness; no joy, blind; a request for information.

U
Unable Cannot comply as requested/directed.
Uniform Ultra-high frequency (UHF) radio.

V
Vampire Hostile antiship missile (ASM).
Very high Above  MSL.
Vic Three groups, contacts, or formations with the single closest in range and two contacts, azimuth split, in trail.
Victor VHF/amplitude modulation (AM) radio.
Visual Sighting of a friendly aircraft/ground position; opposite of blind.

W
Wall Three or more groups or contacts primarily split in azimuth.
Warning (color) Hostile attack is
RED imminent or in progress.
YELLOW probable.
WHITE improbable (all clear).
Weapons (followed by appropriate modifier below) Fire only;
FREE at targets not identified as friendly in accordance with current rules of engagement (ROE).
TIGHT at targets positively identified as hostile in accordance with current ROE.
HOLD* (USA, USMC) in self-defense or in response to a formal order.
SAFE (USN)   NOTE: USN and NATO use weapons safe to avoid confusion with the phrase hold fire.
What luck Request for results of missions or tasks.
What state Report amount of fuel and missiles remaining. Ammunition and oxygen are reported only when specifically requested or critical.
Active = number of active radar missiles remaining.
Radar = number of semi-active radar missiles remaining.
Heat = number of IR missiles remaining.
Fuel = pounds of fuel or time remaining.
Wilco Will comply
Winchester No ordnance remaining, can be used to refer to specific types ordnance or all ordnance.
Woodpecker Close in weapons system (CIWS).
Words Directive or interrogative regarding further information or directives pertinent to mission.
Working
 A suppression of enemy air defenses (SEAD) aircraft is gathering electronic order of battle (EOB) (which emitter controls the operations of other emitters) on a designated emitter; generally followed by signal type, (SAM/AAA/group) bearing, and range, if able.
 Aircraft executing electronic identification (EID) on a specific aircraft/group to obtain identification necessary for beyond visual range (BVR) employment.

Y
Yardstick Directive to use air-to-air tactical air navigation (A/A TACAN) for ranging.

See also
Glossary of RAF code names

References
Notes

Sources

Navy Warfare Development Command (NWDC)
FM 101-5-1: Operational Terms and Graphics, 30 September 1997, Department of the Army/HQ US Marine Corps (Appendix E)
Intelligence Resource Program: TADIL, 23 April 2000, Federation of American Scientists
Military Aviation Glossary

Military terminology
Military lists
Brevity codes